Sir Patrick Jerad O'Dea  (18 April 1918 – 28 August 2010) was a senior New Zealand public servant who organised royal tours of New Zealand. He was educated in Dunedin at the Christian Brothers School (now called Kavanagh College)

Death
O'Dea died on 28 August 2010, aged 92, after a long retirement in Waikanae, where he is buried.

See also
List of Lady & Gentleman Ushers

References

1918 births
2010 deaths
New Zealand public servants
New Zealand Knights Commander of the Royal Victorian Order
People from Waikanae
People educated at Trinity Catholic College, Dunedin